Railcar class M 290.0 (manufactured as Tatra 68), named after an express train which it served as Slovenská strela was manufactured by Tatra Kopřivnice in 1936 for Czechoslovak State Railways.

Only two units were manufactured and were used on newly introduced express train Slovenská strela starting in 1936. They covered the distance in 4 hours and 28 minutes with a maximum speed of 130 km/h. Both were taken out of service when World War II started in 1939. Afterwards, they were only occasionally deployed on local routes.

The M 290.001 was taken out of service in 1953, the M290.002 in 1960. The M 290.002 is now on display in the company museum of Tatra (company) in Kopřivnice. The M 290.001 did not survive. As of August 2018, the car no. 290,002 is being restored at a cost of 35 million crowns (CZK). Upon completion it will once again be capable of full operation.

Gallery

See also 
 Slovenská strela

Rolling stock of the Czech Republic
Rolling stock of Slovakia
Railway locomotives introduced in 1936
Tourist attractions in the Czech Republic
National Cultural Monuments of the Czech Republic

it:Slovenská strela